Fresh Fish is an annual Swedish fashion show and competition for unestablished designers, which takes place in Gothenburg. The company Fresh Fish was founded in 2007 by Ali Davoodi with the idea of creating platforms for unestablished designers in the fields of culture, fashion, and design. Today, as well as the Fresh Fish fashion show, the Fresh Fish Gallery is a platform for new artists. Fresh Fish is also planning to further extend its work to other creative and cultural forms.

History 
The idea behind Fresh Fish arose in 2005 when founder Ali Davoodi wanted to create a concept that focused on unestablished artists and designers from different genres. The purpose was to provide a platform for interaction between the culture and business worlds, as well as the general public. Fresh Fish is the overarching name for a wide range of ideas and operations, some of which are yet to be fully developed. The central idea is about providing a platform for and supporting unestablished designers and artists by using a number of different approaches. The fashion aspect of Fresh Fish was the idea that first took shape. This resulted in Fresh Fish arranging its first fashion show and competition in Exercishuset in Gothenburg on the 5 and 6 May 2007. Since then, exhibitors from across Sweden have annually displayed their creations in the clothing, accessories, and jewellery categories. In 2009 the fashion show moved to Eriksbergshallen and added a third day. From the start, the show has appointed winners for best design. A jury comprising experienced designers from both fashion and design select a winner each year during the closing fashion show on the last day of the event.
The previous winners of Fresh Fish are:   
 2007 Sabina Bryntesson 
 2008 Hanna Lindström
 2009 Anna Falck 
 2010 Thorhildur Johannesdottir
 2011 Tamara Simonovic (Accessories/Jewelry) & Linda Stjärnehag (Clothes Design)
 2012 Sandra Lundblad & Carolina Baldal (Accessories/Jewelry) & Akharadet Ekchanok (Clothes Design)
 2013 Mike Årsjö (Accessories/Jewelry) & Carolina Rönnberg (Clothes Design)

The first prize has included, among other things, some of the winner designer's creations being produced by and sold at one of Sweden's largest fashion stores. Among the companies that have participated with previous Fresh Fish winners are MQ and Nelly.

Fresh Fish Gallery is so far the only other aspect of Fresh Fish to have become operational. Fresh Fish Gallery had its first exhibition on 12 February 2009 at Stampgatan 9 in Gothenburg with the artist Oscar Gard Montàn. Since then, Fredrik Åkum has exhibited his work and exhibitions from Johnny Roy and Malin Heikenberg are planned for later on in 2010.

Media 
The media have followed Fresh Fish since its start in 2007. At the first fashion show, the trees along Vasa Allén in Gothenburg were clad in yellow skirts to draw attention to the new event. This combined with the fashion show itself contributed to a major breakthrough and Fresh Fish was conveyed in positive terms in the media, for example the Gothenburg Post, the Metro, Manolo, and King. Each year, Fresh Fish has been portrayed in the media as something which filled a gap in the Swedish cultural, fashion, and design world. In 2009 Fresh Fish won the Nöjesguiden (a Swedish entertainment guide) prize in the category ‘Form’, which is awarded to people or events that have had an extra special impact upon the city during the previous year.

International partners
In 2009 an international partnership began in conjunction with the Fresh Fish fashion show. Fresh Fish worked with a group of young designers from Belarus, who were visiting Sweden with the Melnitsa Mody project. The purpose of the international focus is to promote new designers from abroad, as well as designers from within Sweden.
The international aspect of Fresh Fish goes under the acronym NAGO (New Arrivals Gothenburg). Fresh Fish creates with NAGO an international forum where designers from different fashion and design cultures get the chance to exchange ideas and inspire each other. The international exhibitors at Fresh Fish fashion show do not participate in the competition. In 2010 NAGO included a partnership with the fashion degree programme at University of Arts and Industrial Design Linz, Austria. Students from the university displayed their collections during the fashion show and they had a separate showing each day and a stand where they displayed their work. Other countries that has been a part of NAGO are Finland (2011), France (2012) and Denmark (2013).

External links
The Fashion Fairs website
The Gallery's website
Official website

Sources
 Article in the Gothenburg Post
 Article in the Gothenburg Post
 Article on SR.se
 Article in Metro
 Video on GP.se
 Radiointerview on SR.se
 Video on SVT.se

Fairs in Sweden